The Tasmanian Rugby Union, or TRU, is the governing body for the sport of rugby union within the state of Tasmania in Australia. The TRU was established in 1933. It is a member and founding union of Rugby Australia.

Currently, the Tasmanian Rugby Union holds a variety of competitions for male and female players, in several age groups and divisions.

The headquarters for the Tasmanian Rugby Union are at Rugby Park, Cornelian Bay, Tasmania.

Affiliated Clubs
As at the end of 2019, there are 13 clubs which make up the TRU.

Ten of these clubs field senior men's sides, eight field senior women's sides, and five field junior sides. There is also a "golden oldies" club for players aged 35+.

The Tasmanian Rugby Union Referee's Association is also directly affiliated with the TRU.

Defunct clubs
 Associates 
The club was formed in 1964 as the University Associates Rugby Football Club. The club won six First Grade Southern and State Premierships in 1965, 1967, 1970, 1971, 1972 and 1984. The club also won 3 Reserve Grade Premierships in 1965, 1981 and 1982.
 West Coast
 Georgetown
 Wellington
 Port Dalrymple
 Glen Dhu
Combined with the Riverview Club in 1998 to become the Launceston Rugby Union Club
 Riverview 
Combined with the Glen Dhu Club in 1998 to become the Launceston Rugby Union Club
 Williamsford
Australian Maritime College Vikings
Army Rugby Club
Reportedly played in a dark green jumper with a white V

Divisions
Rugby Union in Tasmania consists of the following divisions : Men's Premiership (First Grade), Men's Championship (Reserve Grade), Women's, Junior Under 18, Junior Under 16, Juniors Under 14 and Tassie Devils (under 12).

Partnerships

Rugby Balls 
The Tasmanian Rugby Union uses W RUGBY branded rugby balls across all divisions during matches.

2019 Senior Men's competition
There were 11 teams from 9 clubs competing in the club rugby divisions These were:

Premiership Grade
Devonport Rugby Club 
Glenorchy Rugby Union Football Club 
Hobart Harlequins Rugby Union Club 
Hobart Lions Rugby Club 
Taroona Rugby Club 
Australian Maritime College Rugby Union Club – withdrawn from competition prior to start of season

Championship Grade
Burnie Rugby Union Club 
Eastern Suburbs Rugby Union Football Club Inc. 
Hobart Harlequins Rugby Union Club
Launceston Rugby Union Football Club 
Taroona Rugby Club 
University of Tasmania Rugby Union Club

Premierships

{| border="1" cellpadding="3" cellspacing="0" style="border-collapse:collapse; font-size:92%; width:50%; text-align:left; background-color:#F5FAFF;"
|- style="text-align:center; background:#003D01;"
! rowspan=2 style="color:#F9B41B;"| Season
! colspan=2 style="color:#F9B41B;"| Grand Final winners
!
|- style="text-align:center; background:#F9B41B;"
! style="width:16em; color:#003D01;" |Premiership/First Grade
! style="width:16em; color:#003D01;" |Championship/Reserve Grade
!
|-
| align=center | 2020
|  Taroona
| Launceston
|
|-
| align=center | 2019
| Devonport
| Eastern Suburbs
|
|-
| align=center| 2018 
| Taroona
|  Glenorchy
|
|-
| align=center| 2017 
|  Devonport
|  University of Tasmania
|
|-
| align=center| 2016
|  Taroona
|
|
|- 
| align=center| 2015
|  Taroona
|
|
|-
| align=center| 2014 
|  Devonport
|
|
|- 
| align=center| 2013
|  Hobart Harlequins
|  University of Tasmania
|
|- 
| align=center| 2012
|  Taroona
|
|
|-
| align=center| 2011
|  Glenorchy
|
|
|- 
| align=center| 2010
|  Taroona
|
|
|- 
| align=center| 2009
|  Hobart Lions
|
|
|-
| align=center| 2008
|  Glenorchy
|
|
|- 
| align=center| 2007
|  Taroona
|
|
|- 
| align=center| 2006
|  Launceston
|
|
|-
|align=center | '2005|University of Tasmania
|
|
|-
|align=center | 2004
| Launceston
|
|
|-
| align="center" | 2003
|No record|
|
|-
|align=center | 2002
|No record|
|
|-
|align=center | 2001
|No record|
|
|-
|align=center | 2000
| University of Tasmania
|
|
|-
|align=center | 1999
| Launceston
|
|
|-
|align=center | 1998
| Launceston
|
|
|-
|align=center | 1997
|No record| Riverview (Launceston)
|
|-
|align=center | 1996
|No record|
|
|-
| align="center" | 1995
|  Glenorchy
|
|
|-
| align="center" | 1994
|  Glenorchy
|
|
|-
| align="center" | 1993
|  Glenorchy
|
|
|-
| align="center" | 1992
|  Glenorchy
|  Glenorchy
|
|-
| align="center" | 1991
|  Glenorchy
|  Glenorchy
|
|-
|align=center | 1990
|No record|
|
|-
|align="center" |1989
|No record|
|
|- 
| align="center" | 1988
|  Hobart Harlequins
|
|
|- 
| align="center" | 1987
|  Taroona
|
|
|- 
| align="center" | 1986
|  Glenorchy
|
|
|-
| align="center" | 1985
|  Glenorchy
|
|
|- 
| align="center" | 1984
|No record|
|
|-  
| align="center" | 1983
|  Taroona
|  Glenorchy
|
|- 
| align="center" | 1982
|  Taroona
|
|
|- 
| align="center" | 1981
|  Eastern Suburbs
|
|
|-
| align="center" | 1980
|  Glenorchy
|
|
|- 
| align="center" | 1979
|  Taroona
|  Glenorchy
|
|- 
| align="center" | 1978
|No record|
|
|-
| align="center" | 1977
|  Glenorchy
|
|
|-
| align="center" | 1976
|  Glenorchy
|  Glenorchy
|
|-
| align="center" | 1975
|  Glenorchy
|
|
|- 
| align="center" | 1974
|  Hobart Harlequins
|
|
|-
| align="center" | 1973
|  Glenorchy
|
|
|- 
| align="center" | 1968
|  Taroona
|
|
|-
| align="center" | 1967
|No record|  Glenorchy
|
|}

2019 Senior Women's competition
Generally, Senior Women's competitions consist of a series seven's tournaments spread across the year along with several games of 15's format. There were 9 clubs competing in the club rugby divisions These were:
Devonport Rugby Club
Eastern Suburbs Rugby Union Football Club Inc., identified from the Men's team as "The Chicks"
Glenorchy Rugby Union Football Club
Hobart Harlequins Rugby Union Club, identified from the Men's team as "The Queens"
North West Panthers Rugby Club
Tamar Valley Vixens Rugby Club
Taroona Rugby Club 
University of Tasmania Rugby Union Club, identified from the Men's team as the "Red Women"

Representative teams

The senior men's state representative side for the Tasmanian Rugby Union are the Tasmanian Jack Jumpers, named for the jack jumper ant (Myrmecia pilosula)'', a species of venomous bull ant commonly found in Tasmania.

From 2018 an additional competition was formed for teams from so-called "Minor States", called the Emerging States Championship, featuring the Jack Jumpers, Northern Territory Mosquitoes, Adelaide Black Falcons and Victoria Country Barbarians. The first Competition was held in Adelaide in September 2018, and the Black Falcons were the inaugural winners.

 2018 NRC Division 2 Runner Up

Notable players

Adam Coleman, Wallaby 895, and currently playing for London Irish
Eddie Jones, Head Coach of the Wallabies, Japan Sakuras and England national team, born in Burnie, Tasmania
Jack Ford, Wallaby 224,11 caps, born in Sheffield, Tasmania
Eric E. Ford, Wallaby 240, 7 caps, born in Launceston, Tasmania
Justin Collins, Flanker – Chiefs 1998-1999 (10 caps), Blues 1999-2009 (92 caps)
 Ollie Atkins, Waratahs, Edinburgh, Scotland A, Exeter Chiefs, Rouen-Normandie

See also

 Australian Rugby Sevens Championships
 List of Australian club rugby union competitions

References

External links
 Official website: Tasmanian Rugby Union
 Tasmanian Jack Jumpers

 
Australian rugby union governing bodies
Ru
1933 establishments in Australia
Sports organizations established in 1933
Women's rugby union competitions in Australia